Arenibacter antarcticus is a Gram-negative, strictly aerobic and rod-shaped bacterium from the genus of Arenibacter which has been isolated from sediments the Ross Sea.

References 

Flavobacteria
Bacteria described in 2017